Showcase is the third album led by American jazz drummer Philly Joe Jones which was recorded in 1959 for the Riverside label.

Reception

The Allmusic review called it "a particularly interesting hard bop-oriented set... well-conceived, diverse, and recommended".

Track listing
All compositions by Philly Joe Jones except as indicated
 "Battery Blues" (Julian Priester) - 4:06    
 "Minor Mode" (Bill Barron) - 4:26    
 "Gwen" - 3:57    
 "Joe's Debut" - 5:35    
 "Gone" (George Gershwin, Ira Gershwin, DuBose Heyward) - 4:42    
 "Joe's Delight" - 3:50    
 "Julia" (Priester) - 3:26    
 "I'll Never Be The Same" (Gus Kahn, Matty Malneck, Frank Signorelli) - 3:58    
 "Interpretation" (Barron) - 4:02  
Recorded in New York City on November 17 (tracks 1, 4 & 6-8) and November 18 (tracks 2, 3, 5 & 9), 1959.

Personnel 
Philly Joe Jones - drums, piano (track 3)
Blue Mitchell - trumpet (tracks 1, 2 & 4-9)
Julian Priester - trombone  (tracks 1, 2 & 4-9)
Bill Barron - tenor saxophone (tracks 1, 2 & 4-9)
Pepper Adams - baritone saxophone (tracks 1, 2 & 4-9)
Dolo Coker (tracks 1, 4 & 6-8), Sonny Clark (tracks 2, 5 & 9) - piano
Jimmy Garrison - bass (tracks 1, 2 & 4-9)

References 

1959 albums
Philly Joe Jones albums
Albums produced by Orrin Keepnews
Riverside Records albums